Control Panel is a component of Microsoft Windows that provides the ability to view and change system settings. It consists of a set of applets that include adding or removing hardware and software, controlling user accounts, changing accessibility options, and accessing networking settings. Additional applets are provided by third parties, such as audio and video drivers, VPN tools, input devices, and networking tools.

Overview 
Control Panel has been part of Microsoft Windows since Windows 1.0, with each successive version introducing new applets. Beginning with Windows 95, the Control Panel is implemented as a special folder, i.e. the folder does not physically exist, but only contains shortcuts to various applets such as Add or Remove Programs and Internet Options. Physically, these applets are stored as .cpl files. For example, the Add or Remove Programs applet is stored under the name appwiz.cpl in the SYSTEM32 folder. ==
In Windows XP, the Control Panel home screen was changed to present a categorized navigation structure reminiscent of navigating a web page.  Users can switch between this Category View and the grid-based Classic View through an option that appears on either the left side or top of the window. In Windows Vista and Windows 7, additional layers of navigation were introduced, and the Control Panel window itself became the main interface for editing settings, as opposed to launching separate dialogs.

Many of the individual Control Panel applets can be accessed in other ways. For instance, Display Properties can be accessed by right-clicking on an empty area of the desktop and choosing Properties.  The Control Panel can be accessed from a command prompt by typing control; optional parameters are available to open specific control panels.

On Windows 10, Control Panel is deprecated in favor of Settings app, which was originally introduced on Windows 8 as "PC settings" to provide a touchscreen-optimized settings area using its Metro-style app platform. Some functions, particularly the ability to add and remove user accounts, were moved exclusively to this app on Windows 8 and cannot be performed from Control Panel.

As of the October 2020 update to Windows 10, opening up the System applet in Control Panel will now redirect users to the About section of the Windows 10 Settings application. The page for the applet in Control Panel still exists even in current versions of Windows 10, however Microsoft is actively trying to block shortcuts and third party applications that could have been used to get into the old System page, which could potentially lead to a permanent removal of said page from Control Panel in future versions of Windows.

List of Control Panel applets 
The applets listed below are components of the Microsoft Windows control panel, which allows users to define a range of settings for their computer, monitor the status of devices such as printers and modems, and set up new hardware, programs and network connections. Each applet is stored individually as a separate file (usually a .cpl file), folder or DLL, the locations of which are stored in the registry under the following keys:

HKLM\SOFTWARE\Microsoft\Windows\CurrentVersion\Control Panel\CplsThis contains the string format locations of all .cpl files on the hard drive used within the control panel.
HKLM\SOFTWARE\Microsoft\Windows\CurrentVersion\Explorer\ControlPanel\NamespaceThis contains the location of the CLSID variables for all the panels not included as cpl files. These are commonly folders or shell applets, though Windows Vista allows physical programs themselves to be registered as well. The CLSID then allows items such as the icon, infobox and category to be set and gives the location of the file to be used.

The control panel then uses these lists to locate the applets and load them into the control panel program (control.exe) when started by the user. In addition to using the control panel, a user can also invoke the applets manually via the command processor. For instance, the syntax "Control.exe inetcpl.cpl" or "control.exe /name Microsoft.InternetOptions" will run the internet properties applet in Windows XP or Vista respectively. While both syntax examples are accepted on Windows Vista, only the former one is accepted on Windows XP.

Standard applets

Peripheral devices
These are options in the control panel that show devices connected to the computer. They do not actually offer a direct interface to control these devices, but rather offer basic tasks such as removal procedures and links to wizards (Printers & Faxes is an exception). Such applets include Scanners and Cameras, Game Controllers, and Portable Media Devices.

Other Microsoft-distributed applets

Third-party applets
Third-party software vendors have released many applets. Although it is impossible to mention all of them, some of them are listed here:

References

External links 
How to run Control Panel tools by typing a command at Microsoft.com

Computer configuration
Windows components